Sardar Mohammed Aziz Khan (1877 – June 6, 1933) was an Afghan prince and diplomat who served as Minister of Foreign Affairs of the Emirate of Afghanistan, and as Ambassador of the Kingdom of Afghanistan to Nazi Germany, until his assassination by a gunman in Berlin. He was a member of the Musahiban Barakzai dynasty and older half-brother of King Mohammed Nadir Shah, and father of President Mohammed Daoud Khan and Minister of Foreign Affairs Mohammed Naim Khan.   

Upon the succession of his half-brother to the throne, following the Afghan Civil War, he was appointed to the ambassadorship along with his other brothers, who all received high positions of power in return for their continued support in exile in Europe, and on the return to Afghanistan.

Assassination 
While on his assignment to Berlin, he was killed by Sayed Kamal (born on 18 September 1900), an Afghan student of the Technical University of Berlin, on the steps of the Afghan Embassy. The gunman claimed, after being interrogated by the Gestapo, that his motive was discontent with cooperation of the Nadir Shah's regime with the United Kingdom. His assassination came a couple of months before his half-brother, the King was also killed by a gunman in Afghanistan.

The gunman was tried and sentenced to death in 1934 for the murder by Germany, and after a failed extradition attempt by the Afghan government, was executed.

See also 
 List of assassinated serving ambassadors

References 

1877 births
1933 deaths
People from Dehradun
Pashtun people
Barakzai dynasty
Assassinated royalty
Assassinated diplomats
Assassinated Afghan politicians
1933 murders in Germany
20th-century Afghan politicians
Foreign ministers of Afghanistan
Ambassadors of Afghanistan to Germany
1930s in Afghanistan